Sophie Totzauer is an Austrian Model and beauty pageant titleholder who was crowned as Miss Earth Austria 2015 and became her country's representative at Miss Earth 2015 pageant held in Vienna, Austria.

Biography

Early life and career beginnings
Sophie describes her childhood days via Miss Earth official website as, "At the age of about 8 years my family and I moved together from the city Vienna to country-side Lower Austria. I was really happy about this chance in my life because suddenly I was surrounded by beautiful landscape all over, we had a perfect garden with a big house, it was such a perfect place for a child to grow up. People there have been much nicer than in the city. It was less stress."

2015: Miss Earth

Being the winner of Miss Earth Austria 2015, Sophie has become Austria's representative at the Miss Earth 2015 and would try to succeed Jamie Herrell as the next Miss Earth.

As a Miss Earth delegate, an advocacy is a must. When she was asked about her advocacy as Miss Earth, she answered via Miss Earth official website, "My main project is about building fountains together with greenfinity in Bahia Brasil. Water should be a human right and this is something I wanna fight for! Thirst is a constant issue for residents of the Bahia region in North Eastern Brazil. Permanent drought prevails in this area and climate change has caused the situation to deteriorate dramatically in recent years. Rain fails to arrive in the rainy season and the population has no water for their fields and their cattle, not for day-to-day hygiene or to drink. Disease and infection are the result, making the lives of the people much more difficult.

It is mainly great soy producers who buy up land in large parts of Brazil. This is why poor farmers frequently lose their land. Many of them were forced to move to the dry and barren Bahia area in northeast Brazil.

It would be impossible for the residents – who provide for themselves by growing vegetables and fishing – to access water without help, meaning that eventually they would have to migrate and settle in the larger cities.

The Styrian "Verein für Quellen & Hilfsprojekte" (association for springs and aid projects) found out that there is enough ground water in this area to secure survival of the people. It constructs water wells in a quick and simple manner, which secure water supply for the people. Greenfinity, supported by donations from the Lyoness Community, financed the construction of 45 wells, which provide water for 800 people, a school and a hospital. For only 400 Euros a well can be built, which benefits up to 25 families."

When she was also asked about how she can promote her country, she replied, "I want to promote to perfect landscape of Austria, the beautiful lakes, clean rivers and water, lovely mountains and stunning cities with long history. Austria is the perfect combination of old and young. Vienna our capital city is one of the safest cities all over the world."

External links
Sophie Totzauer at Miss Earth official website
Miss Earth Austria 2015 Eco-Beauty Video

References

Miss Earth 2015 contestants
Living people
Models from Vienna
Austrian beauty pageant winners
1990s births